Étienne Mignot de Montigny (15 December 1714, in Paris – 6 May 1782) was a French engineer and geographer.

In the 1730s, he conducted research of textile industries in England, Switzerland and France. Subsequently, he was named a commissioner of the Ministry of Commerce. He was responsible for making improvements to industry and commerce through the application of new inventions and machinery. From 1758 to 1782 he was a member of the Académie Royale des Sciences. He was also an associate of the Prussian Academy of Sciences.

With César-François Cassini de Thury and Charles Étienne Louis Camus, he published the Carte de la France.

Associated works 
 Instruction et avis aux habitans des provinces méridionales de la France, sur la maladie putride et pestilentielle qui détruit le bétail, 1775 – Training and advice to the inhabitants of the southern provinces of France concerning the putrid and pestilential disease that destroys livestock.
 Méthode d’apprêter les cuirs et les peaux, telle qu’on la pratique à la Louisiane, 1780 – Method of preparing hides and skins, as practiced in Louisiana.
 Les voyageurs en Bretagne : voyage de Mignot de Montigny de l'Académie des Sciences en Bretagne, en 1752 (edition by Henri Bourde de La Rogerie, 1926) – The voyagers of Brittany; voyage of Mignot de Montigny in Brittany in 1752.

References 

1714 births
1782 deaths
French engineers
French geographers
Members of the French Academy of Sciences